Wesley J. Hall is a Canadian businessman and entrepreneur, best known as a "Dragon" investor in the Canadian edition of the reality television series Dragons' Den.

Born and raised in Saint Thomas, Jamaica, Hall moved to Toronto, Ontario as a teenager. After being educated as a law clerk at George Brown College, he worked in the legal division of CanWest until founding Kingsdale Advisors, a shareholder services and business consultancy, in 2002. In 2006, the firm became a major player in Canadian business when it managed Xstrata's purchase and takeover of Falconbridge. He also later established QM Environmental, an environmental remediation firm.

In 2020 he launched the BlackNorth Initiative, an organization which works to combat racism in business.

He joined Dragons' Den in 2021 for the show's 16th season.

He has written his autobiography "No Bootstraps When You’re Barefoot", honoring his grandmother.

References

21st-century Canadian businesspeople
Black Canadian businesspeople
Businesspeople from Toronto
Canadian venture capitalists
Jamaican emigrants to Canada
Participants in Canadian reality television series
People from Saint Thomas Parish, Jamaica
Living people
George Brown College alumni
Year of birth missing (living people)